Besania is an extinct genus of prehistoric bony fish that lived during the early Ladinian stage of the Middle Triassic epoch.

See also

 Prehistoric fish
 List of prehistoric bony fish

References

Prehistoric neopterygii
Middle Triassic fish
Triassic fish of Europe